The 2021–22 Aruban Division di Honor was the 61st season of the Division di Honor, the top division football competition in Aruba. The season began on 22 October 2021 and concluded on 25 June 2022.

Teams

Stadiums and locations

Table

Regular season

Caya 4 
Table

Championship series

Relegation playoff 
The 8th and 9th place team in the Honor Division play the 2nd and 3rd place teams in the Division Uno. The top two teams will play in the Honor Division for the 2022–23 season, while the third and forth place team will play in the Division Uno for the 2022–23 season.

Table

Results

Statistics

Top scorers of the 2021-22 Regular Season 

Source: FutbolAruba

Top scorers of 2021-22 Playoffs

Source: FutbolAruba

References

External links 
 Aruba 2021/22 at RSSSF
 Aruban Division di Honor 
 Futbol Aruba

Aruban Division di Honor seasons
Aruba
1